A counterattack is a military tactic. 

"Counter-Attack" and other variations also may refer to:

Counter-Attack (poem) (1918), by Siegfried Sassoon
Counter-Attack, film set in World War II
1941: Counter Attack, video arcade game
Counterattack, right-wing American journal published from 1945–1955

See also 
 Counterstrike (disambiguation)